The Core Banks are barrier islands in North Carolina, part of the Outer Banks and  Cape Lookout National Seashore.  Named after the Coree tribe, they extend from Ocracoke Inlet to Cape Lookout, and consist of two low-relief narrow islands, North Core Banks and South Core Banks, and, since September 2011, two smaller islands.  New Drum Inlet, Old Drum Inlet and Ophelia Inlet now separate the islands.  The Core Banks are now uninhabited. However, Portsmouth, at the north end of the North Core Banks, was once a substantial port, and Cape Lookout Village, about one and half miles south of the Cape Lookout Lighthouse, contains the historic Lookout Life-Saving Station, a U.S. Coast Guard Station, and several island homes.

Access
Islands can be reached by two vehicle ferries.  One ferry crosses Core Sound from Atlantic to North Core Banks, and another crosses the sound from Davis to South Core Banks.  There are no roads on the islands:  vehicles use the beach and four wheel drive tracks. Passenger ferries also take tourists from Harkers Island to the Cape Lookout area at the south end of South Core Banks.

Portsmouth Island, on which Portsmouth Village stands, is a tidal island accessible from North Core Banks at most states of the tide.

History
The Cape Lookout Coast Guard Station, Cape Lookout Light Station, and Cape Lookout Village Historic District are listed on the National Register of Historic Places.

Geography 

The geography of the Core Banks has changed since the mid 19th century.  At that time South Core Banks was connected to the Shackleford Banks.  Over the years inlets have closed and opened in the barrier islands.  From north to south these inlets have been Whalebone Inlet, now closed, which separated Portsmouth Island from the Core Banks, Swash Inlet (closed), Old Drum Inlet (closed in 1971 and reopened by Hurricane Irene in 2011), New Drum Inlet (opened by the U.S. Army Corps of Engineers in 1971), Ophelia Inlet (opened by Hurricane Ophelia in 2005), Cedar Inlet (closed) and Barden Inlet (opened by a hurricane in 1933, separating Shackleford Banks from South Core Banks).

From northeast to southwest, the islands are located in the Townships of Portsmouth, Atlantic, Sea Level, Stacy, Davis, Smyrna, and Harkers Island, all in Carteret County.

Climate

According to the Trewartha climate classification system, Core Banks, North Carolina has a humid subtropical climate with hot and humid summers, cool winters and year-around precipitation (Cfak). Cfak climates are characterized by all months having an average mean temperature > 32.0 °F (> 0.0 °C), at least eight months with an average mean temperature ≥ 50.0 °F (≥ 10.0 °C), at least one month with an average mean temperature ≥ 71.6 °F (≥ 22.0 °C) and no significant precipitation difference between seasons. During the summer months in Core Banks, a cooling afternoon sea breeze is present on most days, but episodes of extreme heat and humidity can occur with heat index values ≥ 100 °F (≥ 38 °C). Core Banks is prone to hurricane strikes, particularly during the Atlantic hurricane season which extends from June 1 through November 30, sharply peaking from late August through September. During the winter months, episodes of cold and wind can occur with wind chill values < 10 °F (< -12 °C). The plant hardiness zone in Core Banks is 8b with an average annual extreme minimum air temperature of 15.3 °F (-9.3 °C). The average seasonal (Dec-Mar) snowfall total is < 2 inches (< 5 cm), and the average annual peak in nor'easter activity is in February.

Ecology

According to the A. W. Kuchler U.S. potential natural vegetation types, Core Banks, North Carolina would have a dominant vegetation type of Live oak/Sea Oats Uniola paniculata (90) with a dominant vegetation form of Coastal Prairie (20).

Gallery

References 

Barrier islands of North Carolina
Beaches of North Carolina
Islands of Carteret County, North Carolina
Outer Banks